Lost in the Stars: Live at 54 Below is the debut album by American actress and singer Annaleigh Ashford, recorded live at 54 Below on multiple dates in 2014 and 2015. The album was released on November 13, 2015. Produced by Ashford, Andy Jones, Will Van Dyke, and Derik Lee, the album features Ashford with songwriter and music director Will Van Dyke and the Whiskey 5 band. It celebrates the classic cabaret with an eclectic mix of music from the disco days of Donna Summer, to the haunting melodies of Kurt Weill and Stephen Sondheim, to a sing-a-long of Alanis Morissette.

Prior to its release, One Night Only was made available as a promotional single through Playbill on October 27, 2015.

Background and development
Inspired by classic live albums such as Patti LuPone at Les Mouches, Live at Last, and Sibling Revelry, Ashford's intent in creating this album was to emulate "a real, old-school, live cabaret recording." She elaborated further on the Theater People Podcast, saying: 
 "My intention in creating [the album] in the first place was to really celebrate the foundation of cabaret, which is true storytelling and song married into one. When we thought about doing an album, I said 'Well if we do one, it has to be live.' Surprisingly, it's really hard to make a live album these days. It's imperfect, and I think that is perfect." 
The album is a compilation of two live shows. The first show recorded was in the Christmas season, but after initial recording, Ashford went on the road with the show, adding more material to replace the holiday themed songs. Feeling as though the holiday songs didn't make as much sense in the album, she went back with another audience to record the selected new material from the road to add to the album for a better overall fit.

Critical reception
The album received an overwhelmingly amount of positive reviews and support during its debut week. Josh Ferri of BroadwayBox gave the album "infinite praise", and dubbed Ashford "The New Queen of Disco". Ryan McPhee for Broadway.com called Ashford "an honorary child of the ‘70s", and said she "seamlessly blends her fantastical aesthetic with an appreciation of the vibrant history of the venue." He also praised the banter, calling it "equally captivating and unskippable with impeccable storytelling". EDGE Media Network's Steven Bergman called her a "highly recommended draw", and celebrated her "knack for patter" in her storytelling and ability to lead the audience in a karaoke rendition of Hand In My Pocket.

Accolades 
In 2016, Lost in the Stars: Live at 54 Below was nominated for two MAC Awards, an annual award ceremony to honor achievements in cabaret, comedy and jazz. The album was nominated for Best Song (Another Time), and Best Major Recording.

Track list

Credits and personnel
Management
 Recorded live at 54 Below
Personnel

Michael Aarons – guitar
Mills Agency – marketing director, press, social media
Annaleigh Ashford – lead vocals, production, kazoo
Alec Berlin – guitar
Emily Brestovansky – executive assistant
Van Dean – president of Broadway Records
Andrew Farber, Esq – legal
Steve Gilewski – bass guitar, photography, design
Andrew Hendrick – executive assistant
Mason Ingram – drums
Beth Rosner – management
Alison Seidner – cello
Brian Usifer – orchestrations
Will Van Dyke – production, arrangement/orchestrations, vocals
Oscar Zambrano – mastering

Deidre Alby – director of marketing
Keith Sherman & Associates – public relations
Steven Baruch – proprietor
Dave C. Frankel – original 54 Below logo design 
Richard Frankel – proprietor
KJ Hardy – production manager
Amanda Raymond – engineering
Marc Routh – proprietor
Jennifer Ashley Tepper – director of programming
Tom Viertel – proprietor

Credits and personnel adapted from Lost in the Stars: Live at 54 Below liner notes.

Release history

References

2015 debut albums
2015 live albums
Live disco albums
Live pop albums